The Public Services Association of Trinidad and Tobago (PSA) is a trade union in Trinidad and Tobago. It was originally known as the Civil Service Association but changed its name in 1971.

The bulk of the PSA membership is in the public sector but it also includes members in statutory authorities such as the Water and Sewerage Authority (WASA).
The PSA has accomplished many victories, many of which are documented by both guardian and newsday.

See also

 List of trade unions
 James Manswell

Trade unions in Trinidad and Tobago
Public Services International
Public sector trade unions